Crematogaster captiosa is a species of ant in tribe Crematogastrini. It was described by Forel in 1911.

References

captiosa
Insects described in 1911